The Robin Boyd Award for Residential Architecture is an Australian architectural prize presented by the Australian Institute of Architects since 1981.

The award is presented in memory of the Australian architect Robin Boyd, and is awarded to residential house designs that set new benchmarks for meeting client's needs, responding to the site and providing shelter that is at the leading edge of house design.

Winners

 1981 Glenn Murcutt - Two Houses, Mount Irvine, New South Wales
 1982 No Award
 1983 McIntyre Partnership - Seahouse, Mornington, Victoria
 1984 Louise St John Kennedy - Residence Redevelopment, East Perth, Western Australia
 1985 Glenn Murcutt - House, South Coast, New South Wales
 1986 Geoffrey Pie Architects/Planners - Pie Residence, Peregian Beach, Queensland
 1987 Ken Woolley - Ancher Mortlock Woolley - Palm Beach House
 1988 Alexander Tzannes - Henwood House, Paddington, New South Wales
 1989 Don Watson - The Campbell House, Graceville, Queensland
 1990 Alex Popov Architects - Griffin House, Castlecrag, New South Wales
 1991 Joint Winners:
Gabriel Pool - Tent House, Queensland 
Dale Jones-Evans - Gallery House, Victoria
 1992 Lindsay Clare Architects - Clare House, Buderim, Queensland
 1993 Joint Winners:
 Gordon & Valich - House, Palm Beach, New South Wales 
 Hamish Lyon and Astrid Jenkin with Charles Salter - Lyon/Jenkin House, Melbourne, Victoria
 1993 Joint Winners, Troppo Architects - Larrakeyah Housing Precinct 2, Northern Territory
 1994 Bud Brannigan - Brannigan Residence, Queensland
 1995 Joint Winners:
 Clare Design Pty Ltd - Hammond Residence, Queensland 
Craig A Rossetti Pty Ltd - 106-112 Cremorne Street, Richmond, Victoria
 1996 Joint Winners:
 Ken Latona - Additions to a front verandah
John Mainwaring & Associates Pty Ltd - Chapman House, Queensland
 1997 Alexander Tzannes Associates - House, Northbridge, New South Wales
 1998 Durbach Block Architects - Droga Apartment, Surry Hills, New South Wales
 1999 Joint Winners:
Denton Corker Marshall - Sheep Farm House
Graham Jahn - Grant House
 2000 Denton Corker Marshall - Emery Residence, Cape Schanck, Victoria 
 2001 Donovan Hill - D House; Queensland
 2002 Bligh Voller Nield & Troppo Architects - Lavarack Barracks Redevelopment Stage 2, Queensland
 2003 Joint Winners:
 Stutchbury + Pape - Bay House, Sydney, New South Wales 
 Kerry Hill Architects - Ogilvie House, Sunshine Beach, Queensland 
 2004 Durbach Block Architects - House Spry, Point Piper, New South Wales
 2005 Stutchbury + Pape - Springwater, New South Wales 
 2006 Sean Godsell Architects -  St Andrews Beach House, Victoria
 2007 Paul Morgan Architects - Cape Schanck House, Cape Schanck, Victoria
 2008 McBride Charles Ryan - Klein Bottle House, Victoria
 2009 Chenchow Little Architects - Freshwater House, Harbord, New South Wales
 2010 HBV Architects - House at Trial Bay, Tasmania
 2011 Neeson Murcutt Architects - Castlecrag House, New South Wales
2012 John Wardle Architects - Shearer's Quarters, North Bruny Island, Tasmania
2013 John Wardle Architects - Fairhaven Residence, Victoria
2014 Kerstin Thompson Architects - House at Hanging Rock, Victoria
2015 Jesse Bennett Architect - Planchonella House, Queensland
2016 Smart Design Studio  - Indigo Slam, Chippendale, New South Wales
2017 Durbach Block Jaggers - Tamarama House, New South Wales
2018 Sean Godsell Architects - House on the Coast, Mornington Peninsula, Victoria
2019 Partners Hill - Daylesford Longhouse, Victoria
2020 Joint Winners:
Peter Stutchbury Architecture - Basin Beach House, New South Wales
Kerstin Thompson Architects - East Street, New South Wales
2021 Peter Stutchbury Architecture - Night Sky, New South Wales
 2022 No Award

References

External links
RAIA Robin Boyd Residential Buildings Award: Winners and commendation recipients: 2006-1981

Architecture awards
Architecture in Australia
1981 establishments in Australia
Awards established in 1981
Australian awards